Frank Elliott (5 July 1911 – 11 January 1964) was a Canadian cyclist. He competed in three events at the 1932 Summer Olympics.

References

External links
 

1911 births
1964 deaths
Canadian male cyclists
Olympic cyclists of Canada
Cyclists at the 1932 Summer Olympics
Cyclists from British Columbia
Sportspeople from Vancouver